The Kanawha-class oiler was a class of oil tankers of United States Navy and later sold to the Republic of China Navy.

Development 
Six oilers were ordered for construction by the Mare Island Naval Shipyard and the Boston Navy Yard. They were one of the earliest purpose-built oilers for the United States Navy. Kanawha and Maumee were recommissioned during the Second World War meanwhile the other ships remained in service ever since commissioning.

The Cuyama subclass was an improved version of the first two ships of the Kanawha class.

Kanawha, Neches and Pecos were sunk in battles in the Pacific against the Japanese while the other three served until the end of the war. Maumee was transferred on a lend lease to the Nationalist Army in China in which she was renamed ROCS Omei (AO-509).

Ships of class

Citations